The Europe/Africa Zone was one of the three zones of the regional Davis Cup competition in 1992.

In the Europe/Africa Zone there were three different tiers, called groups, in which teams competed against each other to advance to the upper tier. Winners in Group II advanced to the Europe/Africa Zone Group I. Teams who lost their respective ties competed in the relegation play-offs, with winning teams remaining in Group II, whereas teams who lost their play-offs were relegated to the Europe/Africa Zone Group III in 1993.

Participating nations

Draw

 and  promoted to Group I in 1993.

First round

Greece vs. Ireland

Bulgaria vs. Malta

Monaco vs. Luxembourg

Egypt vs. Zambia

Zimbabwe vs. Ghana

Togo vs. Ivory Coast

Nigeria vs. Morocco

Second round

Greece vs. Bulgaria

Luxembourg vs. Egypt

Ivory Coast vs. Zimbabwe

Cyprus vs. Morocco

Relegation play-offs

Ireland vs. Malta

Monaco vs. Zambia

Ghana vs. Togo

Third round

Luxembourg vs. Greece

Zimbabwe vs. Morocco

References

External links
Davis Cup official website

Davis Cup Europe/Africa Zone
Europe Africa Zone Group II